Yuri Yurovsky was a Soviet actor and director of Armenian origin. People's Artist of the USSR. Since 1925 he worked as an actor and director at Riga Russian Theatre.

Selected filmography 
 1949 — Encounter at the Elbe
 1950 — Zhukovsky
 1952 — The Composer Glinka

References

External links 
 Юрий Юровский on kino-teatr.ru

Soviet male film actors
1894 births
1959 deaths